The 2008 North Dakota gubernatorial election took place on 4 November 2008 for the post of Governor of North Dakota. Incumbent Republican Governor John Hoeven was easily reelected again, defeating Democratic-NPL challenger Tim Mathern. The primaries took place on June 10, 2008.
John Hoeven outperformed John McCain, the Republican presidential nominee, by about 21%. McCain defeated Democratic nominee Barack Obama 53%-45% in the concurrent presidential election.

Candidates

Republican
John Hoeven, Governor of North Dakota
Running mate: Jack Dalrymple, Lieutenant Governor of North Dakota

Democratic-NPL
Tim Mathern, State Senator
Running mate: Merle Boucher, State Representative

Independent
DuWayne Hendrickson
Running mate: Dana Brandenberg

General election

Predictions

Polling

Results

References

External links
Elections and Voting from the North Dakota Secretary of State 
North Dakota Governor candidates at Project Vote Smart
North Dakota Governor race from OurCampaigns.com
North Dakota Governor race from 2008 Race Tracker
Campaign contributions from Follow the Money
Hoeven (R-i) vs. Mathern (D) graph of collected poll results from Pollster.com
Official campaign websites (Archived)
John Hoeven, Republican incumbent nominee
Tim Mathern, Democratic-NPL nominee
Gregg Boyer, Independent candidate

North Dakota

Gubernatorial
2008